North Macedonia–United Kingdom relations are the bilateral and diplomatic relations between the Republic of North Macedonia and the United Kingdom of Great Britain and Northern Ireland. Both countries are members of the Council of Europe and NATO.

History
Diplomatic relations were first established in 1993 following North Macedonia's (then formerly known officially as the Republic of Macedonia) independence from Yugoslavia in 1991. The UK has supported both North Macedonia's bid to join the European Union and North Macedonia's accession to NATO. In June 1996, the first British-Macedonian parliamentary group was established.

On 3 December 2020, North Macedonia and the United Kingdom signed the Partnership, Trade and Cooperation Agreement to continue preferential trade terms after the end of the UK's Brexit transition period. The agreement also strengthened political, economic, security and cultural ties between both nations.

Diplomatic missions

The current ambassador of North Macedonia to the United Kingdom is Aleksandra Miovska, while Rachel Galloway currently serves as the British ambassador to North Macedonia. North Macedonia operates an embassy in London, and the UK has an embassy in Skopje.

See also
 Foreign relations of North Macedonia
 Foreign relations of the United Kingdom
 Macedonians in the United Kingdom 
 Accession of North Macedonia to the European Union 
 United Kingdom–European Union relations
 United Kingdom–Yugoslavia relations

References

External links
 North Macedonia and the UK - Gov.uk

 

North Macedonia–United Kingdom relations
United Kingdom
Bilateral relations of the United Kingdom